Mean Spirit is a book about the Osage tribe during the Oklahoma oil boom.  It is the first novel by Chickasaw author Linda Hogan. It was nominated for the Pulitzer Prize for Fiction in 1991.

Synopsis
The book is set in the 1920s, at a time when rivers of oil were discovered underneath land in Oklahoma that had been purchased by the Osage Tribe after displacement.  As a result of mineral leases, Grace Blanket became the wealthiest individual in the territory. She is murdered by unknown suspects.  The Graycloud family takes over the care of her daughter and heir Nola Blanket. One-by-one, members of the Graycloud family suffer suspicious deaths, and no-one knew why. Local authorities show no interest in Native deaths. Letters begging for help to Washington DC.  Stace Red Hawk, a Native American government official, decides to investigate: he finds intimidation, fraud, and murder and then something else quite by surprise—that he had a true love for his people along with their brave past.

Theme
Mean Spirit'''s is the recognition that Native Americans culture relies on the survival of the natural world and can easily be corrupted by greed and obsessions to material gains.

PlotMean Spirit is a murder mystery set during an era known as the Osage murders, in Osage Indian Territory in Oklahoma in the 1920s. The Native communities struggle for survival amidst a pool of greed, corruption, and violence when oil is discovered on Osage allotments. The Osage had purchased their land in Oklahoma after displacement. They were forced to divide their land up into individual allotments, with "excess" land being made available to white settlers. The discovery of oil, although bringing in an era of material wealth also led to Osage women being married by adventurers, all Osage people being put under threat of violence and legal decisions of "incompetence," and wholesale profiteering off of the people.

The novel begins with the murder of Grace Blanket and the cover-up of what happened. Grace's daughter, Nola, is now in danger because she was a witness and because she inherits all of her mother's oil-rich land. She is forced to move in with her cousins, the Greyclouds, for protection. Nola soon becomes eligible to marry, but marriage is dangerous as White men view marriage to a Native women with oil land as a business investment and deal. As other Osage continue dying under suspicious circumstances, the evidence suggests that rancher turned oilman, John Hale, is behind the murderous actions. No legal actions are taken until Stace Red Hawk, a "Lakota Sioux working for the U.S. Bureau of Investigation" decides comes to Oklahoma from DC in search of the truth. As the battles between the two worlds mount, Nola and others break away from the greed and start to rediscover their relationship with the land.

The novel makes reference to the Osage murders, the land grabs in Oklahoma, the desperate need for the American Indian Religious Freedom Act (1978) as we see that Indian people are denied the right to practice their religious beliefs, and have private ceremonies raided with religious objects being confiscated to go to museums. The murder of Grace Blanket seems especially relevant given the current issue of Missing and Murdered Indigenous Women, throughout the Americas, while also resonating with the murder of Anna Mae Aquash (1975), as the most well-known murder case in Indian Country.

Hogan portrays multiple views of American Indian religious expression, including the Native American church, sacred fire, the red road, bat medicine, the character Michael Horse writing a new book of the bible, and even a Catholic priest who thinks he has discovered "Native truths" that the other characters all already know.

Hogan's novel takes a pan-Indian as opposed to a strictly tribal approach to fictionalization of history because, although the Osage murders are the premise of the book, the character development and parallel stories focus on a wider Indian community, which includes mixed-bloods and folks with different tribal ancestry. Osage critic and literary scholar Robert Allen Warrior took great exception to Hogan, a Chickasaw author, for not telling the tale as a strictly Osage story, which he sees as supremely disrespectful to Osage history .

ReceptionMean Spirit was selected by the Literary Guild as being "extraordinary...If you take up no other novel this year, or next, this one will suffice to hold, to disturb, to enlighten and to inspire you."

Newsday spoke of the book as follows: "Early in this century, rivers of oil were found beneath Oklahoma land belonging to Indian people, and beautiful Grace Banket became the richest person in the Territory. But she was murdered by the greed of white men, and the Graycloud family, who cared for her daughter, began dying mysteriously. Letters sent to Washington, D.C. begging for help went unanswered, until at last a Native American government official, Stace Red Hawk, traveled west to investigate. What he found has been documented by history: rampant fraud, intimidation, and murder. But he also found something truly extraordinary--his deepest self and abiding love for his people, and their brave past."

It was nominated for the Pulitzer Prize for Fiction in 1991.

Barbara Kingsolver in the LA Times'' found it "relentlessly sad" yet full of realistic, complex characters; she praised Hogan: "She's created empathy. She carves a vast tragedy down to a size and shape that will fit into a human heart."

References

Sources
 
 
 Warrior, Robert Allen, and Dennis Mcauliffe. Vol. 11, no. 1, 1995, pp. 52–55., doi:10.2307/1409043. Accessed 10 May 2019.

Books set in the Osage Nation
1990 American novels
Novels set in the 1920s
Novels set in Oklahoma
1990 debut novels
Atheneum Books books
Books set during the Osage Murders